Harald Molander (25 December 1909 – 15 July 1994) was a Swedish film producer. He produced 38 films between 1941 and 1949. He was the son of director Gustaf Molander and actress Karin Molander.

Selected filmography

 Ride Tonight! (1942)
 Katrina (1943)
 The Emperor of Portugallia (1944)
 Oss tjuvar emellan eller En burk ananas (1945)
 Iris and the Lieutenant (1946)
 Sunshine Follows Rain (1946)
 Crisis (1946)
 The Balloon (1946)
 Soldier's Reminder (1947)
 Rail Workers (1947)
 Poor Little Sven (1947)
 Port of Call (1948)
 Private Bom (1948)
 Woman in White (1949)
 Dangerous Spring (1949)

References

External links

1909 births
1994 deaths
Swedish film producers
Businesspeople from Helsinki